(born 1947 in Tokyo, Japan) is a classical cellist.

Biography

Hirofumi Kanno was born in Tokyo in 1947, began lessons with Hideo Saito (musician) at the age of seven and continued with him at the Toho Gakuen School of Music. On his graduation in 1970, he went to study with Pierre Fournier in Switzerland and, two years later, with Janos Starker at Indiana University. In 1975 Kanno became Starker's assistant. During this time Kanno continued to follow his solo career and in 1974 was awarded third prize in the International Tchaikovsky Competition.

 He won 1st prize in 1969 The 38 Japan Music Competition.
 He won 3rd prize in 1974 The 5 International Tchaikovsky Competition.

links

References 

Japanese classical cellists
1947 births
Living people